"Sins of the Past" is the eleventh episode of the American crime comedy-drama television series Terriers. The episode was written by executive producer Tim Minear, and directed by Tucker Gates. It was first broadcast on FX in the United States on November 17, 2010.

The series is set in Ocean Beach, San Diego and focuses on ex-cop and recovering alcoholic Hank Dolworth (Donal Logue) and his best friend, former criminal Britt Pollack (Michael Raymond-James), who both decide to open an unlicensed private investigation business. In the episode, new evidence on an old case makes Hank decide to revisit it, explaining his days as a detective and how he met Britt.

According to Nielsen Media Research, the episode was seen by an estimated 0.725 million household viewers and gained a 0.4/1 ratings share among adults aged 18–49. The episode received critical acclaim, with critics praising the performances, writing, directing, character development, backstory and pacing, with many deeming it one of the best episodes of the series.

Plot

Flashbacks
Three years ago, Hank (Donal Logue) works as a detective alongside Mark (Rockmond Dunbar). They are introduced to a suspect, Billy Whitman (Chris William Martin), a suspected serial rapist, although Hank does not see the similarities in the description. Hank interrogates a criminal, Britt (Michael Raymond-James), who has been arrested for robbery and suspects him of being the real rapist as he was near the area where a rape took place. Britt's testimony convinces Hank that he was not involved in the rape, as Britt expressed genuine concern for the women. Police also recover a phone recording of Britt reporting a woman screaming, so they are forced to let him go.

Hank learns from his wife Gretchen (Kimberly Quinn), that she was dating Whitman back in college. He interrogates Whitman, who taunts Hank and his relationship with Gretchen. Mark wants to remove him from the case, as his connection to Gretchen and heavy drinking may affect it. This causes a fight between Hank and Gretchen at home. The next day, the police brings the victim to identify possible suspects at a line-up. She struggles at first but identifies one of the men, also claiming that Whitman wasn't responsible despite Hank trying to convince her.

Later, Mark asks Hank about his actions. He states that Whitman got into a car accident, and they found that someone planted evidence that could incriminate him, with Mark suspecting Hank. Hank gets mad and lashes out at the room, with Whitman watching him from the one-way window. Later, Britt is released from prison and is told by Hank that if he knows anything about the events, he should call him. He also tells Britt that he needs to stop his criminal life.

Present day
Having broken up with Katie (Laura Allen), Britt moves out of the house, despite Hank trying to make him change his mind. As he is about to leave, Katie asks what will happen to Winston, to which an angry Britt tells her to decide. She chooses to let him go with Britt, but not before saying farewell to Winston.

Britt moves in with Hank, and they find Laura Ross (Alison Elliott) inside the house. She approaches Hank, as she may have something new regarding Billy Whitman, a criminal whom Hank previously dealt with at his police days. They go to the station, while Britt decides to search for the man who slept with Katie. Sneaking into their house, he uses her laptop to find the man, incorrectly deducing that her classmate Gavin (Zack Silva) was the man. That night, a drunken Britt corners him at a grocery store and brutally attacks him.

At the station, Hank and Mark call Detective Ronnie Reynolds (Craig Susser). They inform him that Laura Ross' and Whitman's newest testimony evidence show that he was involved in the rapes, also realizing that it was Reynolds who planted the evidence on Whitman's car. He was also the first person to arrive at the crime scene and also made the suspects recount the events to him in interrogations. To further confirm his case, CCTV footage shows that Reynolds also destroyed partial evidence of the case just a few minutes earlier. Reynolds is arrested and Whitman and Laura are thanked for their help.

Britt is brought to the station for the attack on Owen. Hank visits Britt at his cell, telling him that he attacked the wrong man, revealing that Katie told him about her one night stand. Britt is furious, while Hank defends his actions, as Britt proved his point by going to prison. Britt angrily tells him to leave, and Hank complies.

Reception

Viewers
The episode was watched by 0.725 million viewers, earning a 0.4/1 in the 18-49 rating demographics on the Nielson ratings scale. This means that 0.4 percent of all households with televisions watched the episode, while 1 percent of all households watching television at that time watched it. This was a 34% increase in viewership from the previous episode, which was watched by 0.539 million viewers with a 0.2/1 in the 18-49 rating demographics.

Critical reviews
"Sins of the Past" received critical acclaim. Noel Murray of The A.V. Club gave the episode a "B+" grade and wrote, "As always though, my complaints are more nitpicky than anything: minor gripes at a show that's capable of taking even an alcoholic stupor and finding its finer shading, as 'Sins Of The Past' does elsewhere."

Alan Sepinwall of HitFix wrote, "Though Terriers isn't exactly a show with a complicated mythology like Angel or Firefly, there is a lot of messy history to these characters that predates the events of the pilot. We've had hints or vague descriptions about how Hank lost his job and his wife, how he and Britt met, etc., and it feels right that we should dig up the past before Hank can make his move against Zeitlin in the final episodes." Ken Tucker of Entertainment Weekly wrote, "This week's episode of Terriers was the new series' best hour to date. It took the oldest trick in the TV handbook — a flashback episode that showed us how our heroes arrived at the point in their lives we're now following — and made it triumphant storytelling."

Matt Richenthal of TV Fanatic gave the episode a 4.7 star rating out of 5 and wrote, "Many shows make the mistake of using flashbacks as nothing but a gimmick, revealing very little about characters and simply assuming viewers will be happy with the mere idea of going back in time. But 'Sins of the Past' gave us the answer to a pressing question - why did Hank's marriage fall apart? - while tying that storyline into present day events and character developments. It was yet another outstanding outing for what long ago stopped being the best show no one is watching, and started to come very close to being the best show on TV. Period." Cory Barker of TV Overmind wrote, "'Sins of the Past' is a flashback episode to the case that cost Hank his job and his marriage and it's also unbelievably powerful. I can't say for sure because the recency effect might in play here, but as of now, 'Sins' is definitely my favorite episode of the season and is absolutely one of the 2-3 best thus far."

References

External links
 

2010 American television episodes
Terriers episodes
Television episodes written by Tim Minear